The Percussion Concerto No. 2 is a concerto for solo percussion and orchestra by the Scottish composer James MacMillan.  The work was jointly commissioned by the Netherlands Radio Philharmonic, the Philharmonia Orchestra, the Orchestre national du Capitole de Toulouse, the Cabrillo Festival of Contemporary Music, the Baltimore Symphony Orchestra, and the São Paulo State Symphony.  It was first performed on November 7, 2014 at TivoliVredenburg in Utrecht, the Netherlands, by percussionist Colin Currie and the Netherlands Radio Philharmonic under conductor James Gaffigan.  The composition is MacMillan's second percussion concerto after 1992's Veni, Veni, Emmanuel.

Composition
The Percussion Concerto No. 2 has a duration of roughly 25 minutes and is composed in one continuous movement.

Instrumentation
The concerto is scored for solo percussion and an orchestra comprising two flutes, two oboes (2nd doubling cor anglais), two clarinets (2nd doubling bass clarinet), bassoon, contrabassoon, four horns, three trumpets, three trombones, tuba, timpani, two percussionists (glockenspiel, two marimbas, tuned gongs, siren, bass drum, suspended sizzle cymbal, tam-tams, tubular bells, tom-tom drums, snare drum, two suspended cymbals, two triangles, thunder sheet), harp, piano, and strings.

The soloist's percussion battery consists of crotales, cencerros, aluphone, vibraphone, marimba, steel drum, four wood blocks, two gliss gongs, eight "assorted pieces of metal", floor tom-toms, high tom-toms, and a pedal bass drum.

Reception
Reviewing the United Kingdom premiere of the Percussion Concert No. 2 with the Philharmonia Orchestra, Tim Ashley of The Guardian lauded the piece and its performer, saying the work "confirms Currie's status as an athlete and a star, as well as an outstanding musician."  Richard Fairman of the Financial Times compared the work to MacMillan's Veni, Veni, Emmanuel, saying, "The new concerto does not have the same bullet-like trajectory as that piece, though it shares a similar high-energy orchestral virtuosity."  John Allison of The Daily Telegraph wrote:

Reviewing the United States premiere of the piece at the Cabrillo Festival of Contemporary Music, Georgia Rowe of the San Jose Mercury News also praised the work, saying it "gave the orchestra a workout." He added, "Cast in a single movement, it's a high-energy work that employs an even larger orchestra than MacMillan's first percussion concerto, Veni, Veni Emmanuel. The writing is distinctive — bows hitting strings, brass blaring, a growling bassoon. Toward the end of the piece, a gentle hymn emerges from the fray."

See also
List of compositions by James MacMillan

References

Concertos by James MacMillan
2014 compositions
MacMillan 2
Music commissioned by the Baltimore Symphony Orchestra
Music commissioned by the Philharmonia Orchestra